Boss Hogg Outlaws is a collaborative studio album by American southern rap artists E.S.G. and Slim Thug from Houston, Texas. It was released on November 6, 2001 via Houston-based record label S.E.S. Entertainment. It features guest appearances from Big Hawk, Bun B, Carmen SanDiego, Daz Dillinger, Lil' Keke, Lil' O, Scarface and Z-Ro. The album peaked at #55 on the Top R&B/Hip-Hop Albums, #16 on the Independent Albums and #30 on the Heatseekers Albums in the US Billboard charts. Two singles were released from the album: "Getchya Hands Up" and "Thug It Up".

Track listing

Personnel

Cedric Dormaine Hill – main artist, executive producer
Stayve Jerome Thomas – main artist, executive producer
Bernard Freeman – featured artist (track 4)
Brad Terrence Jordan – featured artist (track 6)
Marcus Lakee Edwards – featured artist (track 7)
Carmen Ginwright – featured artist (track 9)
Delmar Drew Arnaud – featured artist (track 10)
Ore Magnus Lawson – featured artist (track 11)
John Edward Hawkins – featured artist (tracks: 13, 19)
C. "C-Styles" Lander – featured artist (track 14)
Joseph Wayne McVey IV – featured artist (track 16)
T. "Sir Daily" Harris – featured artist (track 18)
Doodie – featured artist (track 18)
Sinclair "Sin" Ridley – additional vocals (track 3), additional programming (tracks: 8, 16), producer (tracks: 1, 4-5, 7, 10-12, 14, 18), recording, mixing, mastering, executive producer
Michael Wilson – additional vocals (tracks: 10, 13)
Rick Marcel – guitar (track 18)
Dantly "Prowler" Wyatt – producer (tracks: 3, 16)
Quincy Whetstone – producer (tracks: 9, 15)
N. Sneed – producer (track 8)
Chop Shop – producer (track 13)
Automatik Media – artwork

Charts

References

External links

2001 albums
E.S.G. (rapper) albums
Slim Thug albums
Collaborative albums